The Philippines competed at the 2019 Winter Universiade in Krasnoyarsk, Russia. The Philippines only had a sole competitor in figure skating. This marked the first time the country competed in the Winter Universiade.

Figure skating

The only athlete which represented the Philippines at the games was Misha Fabian who was accompanied by Ronan Jay Capili, her Filipino coach. She failed to advanced to the free program after placing 34th out of 35 competitors.

Singles

See also
Philippines at the 2019 Summer Universiade

References

Winter Universidade
2019 Winter Universiade
Nations at the 2019 Winter Universiade